Somerset v Stewart (1772) 98 ER 499 (also known as Somersett's case,  v. XX Sommersett v Steuart and the Mansfield Judgment) is a judgment of the English Court of King's Bench in 1772, relating to the right of an enslaved person on English soil not to be forcibly removed from the country and sent to Jamaica for sale. Lord Mansfield decided that:

Slavery had never been authorised by statute within England and Wales, and Lord Mansfield found it also to be unsupported within England by the common law, although he made no comment on the position in the overseas territories of the British Empire. The case was closely followed throughout the Empire, particularly in the Thirteen American Colonies.  Scholars have disagreed over precisely what legal precedent the case set.

Facts
James Somerset, an enslaved African, was purchased by Charles Stewart (or Steuart), a customs officer when he was in Boston, Province of Massachusetts Bay, a British crown colony in North America.

Stewart brought Somerset with him when he returned to England in 1769, but in October 1771 Somerset escaped. After he was recaptured in November, Stewart had him imprisoned on the ship Ann and Mary (under Captain John Knowles), bound for the British colony of Jamaica. He directed that Somerset be sold to a plantation for labour. Somerset's three godparents from his baptism as a Christian in England, John Marlow, Thomas Walkin and Elizabeth Cade, made an application on 3 December before the Court of King's Bench for a writ of habeas corpus. Captain Knowles on 9 December produced Somerset before the Court of King's Bench, which had to determine whether his imprisonment was lawful.

The Chief Justice of the King's Bench, Lord Mansfield, ordered a hearing for 21 January; in the meantime he set the prisoner free on recognisance. Somerset's counsel's request to prepare arguments was granted, and so it was not until 7 February 1772 that the case was heard. In the meantime, the case had attracted a great deal of attention in the press and members of the public donated money to support the lawyers for both sides of the argument.

Granville Sharp, an abolitionist layman who continually sought test cases against the legal justifications for slavery, was Somerset's real backer. When the case was heard, five advocates appeared for Somerset, speaking at three hearings between February and May. These lawyers included Francis Hargrave, a young lawyer who made his reputation with this, his first case; James Mansfield; Serjeant-at-law William Davy; Serjeant-at-law John Glynn; John Alleyne; and the noted Irish lawyer and orator John Philpot Curran, whose lines in defence of Somerset were often quoted by American abolitionists (such as Frederick Douglass).

Somerset's advocates argued that while colonial laws might permit slavery, neither the common law of England nor any statutory law made by Parliament recognised the existence of slavery and slavery was therefore unlawful. The advocates also argued that English contract law did not allow for any person to enslave himself, nor could any contract be binding without the person's consent. The arguments focused on legal details rather than any humanitarian principles. When the two lawyers for Charles Stewart put their case, they argued that property was paramount and that it would be dangerous to free all the black people in England, who numbered at the time approximately 15,000.

Judgment

Lord Mansfield heard arguments and first gave a short opinion in court, encouraging the parties to come to a settlement by letting Somerset go free. Otherwise, he said that a judgment would be given. As he put it, let justice be done whatever the consequence.

Having heard both sides of the argument, Mansfield retired to make his decision, and reserved judgment for over a month. He gave his judgment on 22 June 1772. (This version is transcribed from a letter to the General Evening Post, reporting on the trial. It has modern paragraphing.)

Significance

After the decision
Somerset was freed and his supporters, who included both Black and White Londoners, celebrated in response. Whilst argument by counsel may have been based primarily on legal technicalities, Lord Mansfield appeared to believe that a great moral question had been posed and he deliberately avoided answering that question in full, because of its profound political and economic consequences.

There were numerous reaction from prominent individuals in Britain over the decision; Sharp rhetorically asked "why is it that the poor sooty African meets with so different a measure of justice in England and America, as to be adjudged free in the one, and in the other held in the most abject Slavery?" Meanwhile, hymnwriter William Cowper wrote in a poem that "we have no slaves at home - then why abroad?" Polymath Benjamin Franklin, who was visiting England at the time, was less impressed with the celebrations of British abolitionists over the case, criticising their celebrations:

Lord Mansfield is often misquoted as declaring that "this air is too pure for a slave to breathe in", but no such words appear in the judgment. Rather, these words are part of the peroration of William Davy SL for Somerset, who previously had cited a report of a 1569 case, in the reign of Queen Elizabeth I, in which "one Cartwright brought a slave from Russia and would scourge him; for which he was questioned; and it was resolved, that England was too pure an air for a slave to breathe in". It is not clear that this was said in the Cartwright case. Some legal historians think it was a misquote of an excerpt from Lord Chief Justice John Holt's judgment in Smith v Gould, in which he is reported to have said: "as soon as a negro comes to England he is free; one may be a villein in England, but not a slave."

Precedent
Legal academics have argued for years over precisely what legal precedent was set in the case. Differences in reports of the judgment make it hard to determine just how far Lord Mansfield went in acknowledging the broader issues behind his deliberately narrow ruling. The passage of the judgment in the standard collections of law reports does not appear to refer to the removal of slaves by force from the country, whereas the same passage in the informal report by letter to the Evening Post, quoted above, does.

In 1785, Lord Mansfield expressed the view in R v Inhabitants of Thames Ditton that his ruling in the Somerset case decided only that a slave could not be forcibly removed from England against his will.  In the Thames Ditton case, a black woman named Charlotte Howe had been brought to England as a slave by one Captain Howe.  After Captain Howe died, Charlotte sought poor relief from the Parish of Thames Ditton.  Mansfield stated that the Somersett case had determined only that a master could not force a slave to leave England, much as in earlier times a master could not forcibly remove his villein.  He ruled that Charlotte was not entitled to relief under Poor Laws because relief was dependent on having been "hired", and this did not relate to slaves.  In the official report of the case, Lord Mansfield is recorded as actually interrupting counsel to specifically state: "The determinations go no further than that the master cannot by force compel him to go out of the kingdom."

The official report of Thames Ditton case supports the account of his judgment given in The Times letter, and it is the strongest argument for a limited scope to the decision. Mansfield's judgment in the Somerset case does not expressly say that slaves became free when they entered England—it is silent as to what their status in England was. In the Thames Ditton case, Lord Mansfield appeared to compare a slave's status to that of "villein in gross"—i.e., an ancient feudal status of servitude that had not technically been abolished from English Law but which had died out in practice. He had not done so in the Somerset case despite the invitation of Stewart's counsel.

The Somerset judgment, even if limited to prohibiting the forcible removal of slaves from England, established a radical precedent. It went against the published opinion of the Attorney-General, Sir Philip Yorke and the Solicitor-General, Mr Talbot in 1729, and the court decision of Sir Philip Yorke, by then Lord Chancellor Hardwicke, in 1749 in the case of Pearne v Lisle. The latter had stated that slaves were items of property (Hardwicke described them as 'like stock on a farm'), who were not emancipated either by becoming Christian or by entry into England, that possession of them could be recovered by the legal action of trover, and that their master might lawfully compel them to leave England with him. The claim of 1749 relied on the opinion of 1729, which quoted no precedents and gave no reasoning. There were other freedom suits with different rulings before 1772, notably Shanley v Harvey (1763) and R v Stapylton (1771, also before Lord Mansfield). While Mansfield's judgment avoided making a definitive judgment about the legality of slavery in England, it nonetheless challenged the assumptions that enslaved people were no more than property, and that "Britishness" and whiteness were inseparable categories.

The precedent established by Somerset's case was seen to have wider implications. In The Slave Grace in 1827, Lord Stowell upheld the decision of the Vice-Admiralty Court in Antigua, whereby a slave who had returned to the colonies, after having resided in England for a year where she was free and no authority could be exercised over her, by her voluntary return had to submit to the authority over her resulting from the slavery law of Antigua. Lord Stowell criticised Lord Mansfield's judgment in the Somerset case, describing it as having reversed the judgment of Lord Hardwicke and establishing that "the owners of slaves had no authority or control over them in England, nor any power of sending them back to the colonies".

Lord Stowell further said:

This wider reading of Somerset's case appears to be supported by the judgment of Mr. Justice Best in Forbes v Cochrane in 1824. He said, "There is no statute recognising slavery which operates in that part of the British empire in which we are now called upon to administer justice." He described the Somerset case as entitling a slave in England to discharge (from that status), and rendering any person attempting to force him back into slavery as guilty of trespass. But not all reports of the case agree.

Whatever the technical legal ratio decidendi of the case, the public at large widely understood the Somerset case to mean that, on English soil at least, no man was a slave.

Domestic effect

While Somerset's case provided a boon to the abolitionist movement, it did not end the holding of slaves within England. It also did not end British participation in the slave trade or slavery in other parts of the British Empire, where colonies had established slave laws. Despite the ruling, escaped slaves continued to be recaptured in England. Just a year after the Somerset ruling, there was a newspaper report of a runaway being recaptured and committing suicide in England. In addition, contemporary newspaper advertisements show that slaves continued to be bought and sold in the British Isles. In 1779, a Liverpool newspaper advertised the sale of a black boy, and a clipping of the ad was acquired by Sharp himself. In 1788,  anti-slavery campaigners, including Thomas Clarkson and James Ramsay, bought a slave in England to prove that slavery still existed in the country. In 1792, a Bristol newspaper reported the sale of a female African slave in the port.

It was not until 1807 that Parliament decided to suppress the slave trade, not only outlawing the practice by British subjects but also seeking to suppress the trade by foreigners, through the sea power of the Royal Navy. Although the slave trade was suppressed, slavery continued in various parts of the British Empire until it was abolished by the Slavery Abolition Act 1833. The slave merchants who funded Stewart's defence were not anxious about James Somerset or the relatively limited number of slaves in Great Britain but about how abolition might affect their overseas interests. In the end, merchants could continue trading slaves for 61 years after Lord Mansfield's decision. Commentators have argued that the decision's importance lay in the way it was portrayed at the time and later by the newspapers, with the assistance of a well-organised abolitionist movement.

Abolitionists argued that the law of England should apply on English ships even if not in the Colonies. Stewart's counsel, funded and encouraged by the slave merchants, argued that the consequence of a judgment in Somerset's favour might be to free the slaves in England, said to be 14,000 in number. As Lord Mansfield said in the case report, "The setting 14,000 or 15,000 men at once free loose by a solemn opinion is much disagreeable in the effects it threatens". He tried to persuade Stewart to settle by releasing Somerset and so avoid a decision, as he had done in other cases.

In 1780, Mansfield's house had been firebombed by a Protestant mob because of his judgments in support of rights for Catholics. In the Thames Ditton case, Lord Mansfield appeared to seek to limit the influence of the Somerset case.

Lord Mansfield freed Somerset by his ruling and did so in the face of the 1729 opinion of the Attorney-General and Solicitor-General, men whom Mansfield in the Somerset case described as "two of the greatest men of their own or any times". The prominence of the case emphasised the issues to the public. It was widely, and incorrectly, interpreted as ending slavery in Britain. Even Mansfield himself considered slavery to still be legal in Britain. When Mansfield died, his 1782 will granted his mulatto grand-niece, Dido Elizabeth Belle, her freedom, indicating that slavery continued to be legal.

Nonetheless, abolitionists considered this case to be Lord Mansfield's legacy and a watershed in the abolition of slavery. It is an example in English law of the maxim he quoted as a warning to the parties in the case before he began his months of deliberation, "Let justice be done though the heavens fall".

Influence in Great Britain and colonies
The Somerset case became a significant part of the common law of slavery in the English-speaking world, and helped launch a new wave of abolitionism. Lord Mansfield's ruling contributed to the concept that slavery was contrary "both to natural law and the principles of the English Constitution", a position adopted by abolitionists.

The case of Knight v Wedderburn in Scotland began in 1774 and was concluded in 1778, with a ruling that slavery had no existence in Scottish common law. Some lawyers thought that similar determinations might be made in British colonies, which had clauses in their Royal charters requiring their laws not to be contrary to the laws of England; they usually contained qualifications along the lines of "so far as conveniently may be". Activists speculated that the principles behind Lord Mansfield's decision, might demand a rigorous definition of "conveniently", if a case were taken to its ultimate conclusion. Such a judicial ruling never took place as the Thirteen Colonies gained independence by 1783 and established laws related to slavery, with the northern states abolishing it, several gradually.

The Royal Navy began unilaterally interdicting the atlantic slave trade in 1807 with the establishment of the West Africa Squadron. At its height slavery interdiction would take up a 6th of the Royal Navy's fleet and would interdict the African-Middle East slave trade.

Slavery in the rest of the British Empire continued until it was ended by the Slavery Abolition Act 1833. India was excluded from these provisions, as slavery was considered part of the indigenous culture and was not disrupted..

Thirteen Colonies and United States
The Somerset case was reported in detail by the American colonial press. In Massachusetts, several slaves filed freedom suits in 1773–1774 based on Mansfield's ruling; these were supported by the colony's General Court (for freedom of the slaves), but vetoed by successive Royal governors. As a result, some individuals in pro-slavery and anti-slavery colonies, for opposite reasons, desired a distinct break from English law in order to achieve their goals with regard to slavery.

Beginning during the Revolutionary War, Northern states began to abolish or rule against maintaining slavery. Vermont was the first in 1777, followed by Pennsylvania (1780), Massachusetts (1783) and Connecticut (1784). In Massachusetts, rulings related to the freedom suits of Brom and Bett v Ashley (1781) and Quock Walker (1783) in county and state courts, respectively, resulted in slavery being found irreconcilable with the new state constitution and ended it in the state. In this sense, the Walker case is seen as a United States counterpart to the Somerset Case. In the case of Quock Walker, Massachusetts' Chief Justice William Cushing gave instructions to the jury as follows, indicating the end of slavery in the state:

After the American Revolution, the Somerset decision "took on a life of its own and entered the mainstream of American constitutional discourse" and was important in anti-slavery constitutionalism.

In the Southern states, slavery was integral to the economy and expanded after the Revolution, due largely to the development of the cotton gin, making cultivation of short-staple cotton profitable as a commodity crop throughout the Deep South, in the early to mid-19th century. Slavery in the states was protected from federal interference by the new Constitution of the United States.

France and slavery
Somerset's case has been compared to the major French case on the same question, Jean Boucaux v Verdelin of 1738. Boucaux was born a slave in the French colony of Saint-Domingue (now Haiti). He was brought by his master Verdelin, an army sergeant, to France in 1728, where he served as his cook. After some years, Verdelin began to seriously mistreat Boucaux. The slave had married a French woman without Verdelin's consent, and the master had him imprisoned for fear that Boucaux would try to escape. Boucaux filed a freedom suit from prison, seeking confirmation of his free status in France. Following French practice, the arguments of the lawyers are recorded, but those for the judgment are not. The lawyers' arguments covered the whole history of the status of slavery in mainland France.

Boucaux won his case and was awarded back wages for the period of his work in France. Later that year, the national legislature passed a law to clarify some of the issues raised by the case. It did not abolish slavery in France. The law was implemented with regulations requiring the registration of slaves. The law provided that masters could bring colonial slaves to live and train in a "useful trade" in France for up to three years, without losing the right to return such slaves to servitude in the colonies. Other cases followed.

See also
 Abolitionism in the United Kingdom
 Boone v Eyre (1779) 1 Henry Blackstone 273, a subsequent Lord Mansfield case relating to a condition precedent
 Dred Scott
 Little Ephraim Robin John and Ancona Robin John
 Ottobah Cugoano
 United Kingdom constitutional law
 United Kingdom labour law
 William Cushing

References

Bibliography
 
 Buehner, Henry Nicholas. Mansfieldism: Law and Politics in Anglo-America, 1700-1865 (PhD dissertation Temple University, 2014).
 Dziobon, Sheila. "Judge, jurisprudence and slavery in England 1729–1807." in Colonialism, Slavery, Reparations and Trade (2012): 185-210.
 Gerzina, Gretchen Holbrook. Black London: Life Before Emancipation (Rutgers University Press, 1997)
 Hulsebosch, Daniel J. "Nothing But Liberty: Somerset's Case and the British Empire." Law and History Review 24 (2006): pp. 547–557.
 
 
 
 Webb, Derek A. "The Somerset Effect: Parsing Lord Mansfield's Words on Slavery in Nineteenth Century America." Law & History Review 32 (2014): 455+.
 Wiecek, William M. "Somerset: Lord Mansfield and the Legitimacy of Slavery in the Anglo-American World," University of Chicago Law Review 42, No. 1 (1974): 86-146.

External links

  Judgment in Somerset case
  Alternative version of judgment in Somerset case

1772 in case law
1772 in British law
Slavery case law
English property case law
United Kingdom constitutional case law
United Kingdom labour case law
Lord Mansfield cases
Abolitionism in the United Kingdom
Court of King's Bench (England) cases
Trials in the Kingdom of Great Britain
Slavery in England
1772 in England